City Building may refer to:

 City Building (Illinois), a historic Illinois building
 City Building (series), a series of video games published by Sierra
 City-building game, a genre of video games
City hall, the chief administrative building of a city
City Building in the New South, a 1983 nonfiction book